The boys' singles event of the 2017 BWF World Junior Championships was held on 16–22 October. The defending champion was Sun Feixiang from China.

Seeds 

  Kunlavut Vitidsarn (champion)
  Lakshya Sen (quarterfinals)
  Lee Chia-hao (fourth round)
  Leong Jun Hao (final)
  Ruttanapak Oupthong (fifth round)
  Kodai Naraoka (semifinals)
  Ikhsan Rumbay (third round)
  Nhat Nguyen (quarterfinals)

  Dmitriy Panarin (third round)
  Cristian Savin (fourth round)
  Arnaud Merklé (fifth round)
  Sim Fong Hau (fourth round)
  Kartikey Gulshan Kumar (fifth round)
  Christo Popov (quarterfinals)
  Leo Rossi (fifth round)
  Chan Yin Chak (third round)

Draw

Finals

Top half

Section 1

Section 2

Section 3

Section 4

Section 5

Section 6

Section 7

Section 8

Bottom half

Section 9

Section 10

Section 11

Section 12

Section 13

Section 14

Section 15

Section 16

References

2017 BWF World Junior Championships